The 2017–18 season was Northampton Town's 121st season of existence and their second season back in League One after a seven-year absence. Along with competing in League One, the club also participated in the FA Cup, EFL Cup and EFL Trophy.

The season ran from 1 July 2017 to 30 June 2018.

Players

Pre-season
As of 26 June 2017, Northampton Town have announced six pre-season friendlies, against Derby County, Frome Town, Northampton Sileby Rangers, Kettering Town, Birmingham City 'Dev' and Newport County.

Competitions

League One

League table

League position by match

Matches

On 21 June 2017, the league fixtures were announced.

FA Cup

On 16 October 2017, the first round draw was made with Northampton Town drawn at home against Scunthorpe United. A 0–0 draw meant a replay had to be played at Glanford Park.

Carabao Cup

On 16 June 2017, the first round draw was made with Northampton Town drawn away against QPR.

Checkatrade Trophy

On 12 July 2017, the group stage draw was made with Northampton Town drawn in a group with Southampton U23s, Cambridge United and Peterborough United. After finished as runners-up in the group stages, Northampton were drawn away to Portsmouth in the second round.

Appearances, goals and cards

Awards

Club awards
At the end of the season, Northampton's annual award ceremony, including categories voted for by the players and backroom staff, the supporters, will see the players recognised for their achievements for the club throughout the 2017–18 season.

Transfers

Transfers in

Transfers out

Loans in

Loans out

References

Northampton Town
Northampton Town F.C. seasons